Chengdu Medical College is a station on Line 3 of the Chengdu Metro in China. It serves the nearby Chengdu Medical College Xindu Campus and it is the northern terminus of Line 3.

Station layout

Gallery

References

Railway stations in Sichuan
Railway stations in China opened in 2018
Chengdu Metro stations